The 1953 Akron Zips football team was an American football team that represented the University of Akron in the Ohio Athletic Conference (OAC) during the 1953 college football season. In its second and final season under head coach Kenneth Cochrane, the team compiled a 6–3 record (4–2 against OAC opponents) and was outscored by a total of 210 to 198. Frank Gradyan was the team captain. The team played its home games at the Rubber Bowl in Akron, Ohio.

Schedule

References

Akron
Akron Zips football seasons
Akron Zips football